101 Mile Lake is a small lake located near the town of 100 Mile House, British Columbia. Like the town, the lake is named because of its distance from Lillooet via the Old Cariboo Road.

References

Lakes of the Cariboo
Lillooet Land District